Way Upstream is a play by Alan Ayckbourn. It was first performed, under Ayckbourn's direction, in Scarborough, North Yorkshire, UK, "in the round" at the Stephen Joseph Theatre, on 2 October 1981. Although realistic in style, with a setting of a hired cabin cruiser on an English river, some journalists read it as an allegory of the political state of England at the time, with the violent resolution of the usurping captain's tyrannical regime taking place at "Armageddon Bridge", and crew members "Alistair" and "Emma" (representing an innocent "Adam" and "Eve") making a new start at the end.  Ayckbourn, however, always maintained he was an apolitical writer and is on frequent record for his lack of interest in party politics; his website makes it clear that the play is not about the political state of the nation.

Original cast
Keith: Robin Bowerman
June: Carole Boyd
Alistair: Robin Herford
Emma: Lavinia Bertram
Mrs Hatfield: Susan Uebel
Vince: Graeme Eton
Fleur: Gillian Bevan

London opening
The London première was at the proscenium Lyttelton Theatre on 4 October 1982, with Ayckbourn again directing. It had been postponed since August; the production became notorious because of its many technical problems during rehearsal, most spectacularly the bursting of the water tank  which flooded the National Theatre.

Cast
Keith: Tony Haygarth
June: Susan Fleetwood
Alistair: Jim Norton
Emma: Julie Legrand
Mrs Hatfield: Jane Downs
Vince: James Laurenson
Fleur: Nina Thomas

Critical reception
At the much-delayed première the excitement of the technical problems distorted the appreciation of some critics with Jack Tinker, representative of the  Daily Mail, turning up wearing wellington boots. Most, however, found a work of "genuine merit".

Other productions
It is possible to stage the work without a flooded set and it remains popular with both professional companies and amateur societies. It was revived at the Stephen Joseph Theatre in October 2003.
In 1987 the BBC adapted the play as a TV movie, but this has never been released on DVD.

BBC Cast
Keith: Barrie Rutter
June: Marion Bailey
Alistair: Nick Dunning
Emma: Joanne Pearce
Mrs Hatfield: Veronica Clifford
Vince: Stuart Wilson
Fleur: Lizzy McInnerny

References

External links
 Way Upstream on official Ayckbourn site

Plays by Alan Ayckbourn
1981 plays